The Intervention is an EP by indie rock band The Color Fred.

Background
In January 2009, it was revealed that the band was demoing new material.

Release
In March and April 2009, the band went on tour alongside Craig Owens, Ace Enders and A Million Different People, the Gay Blades, VersaEmerge. The EP was released on April 18 through Equal Vision Records. The EP was limited to 1,000 copies. The re-recorded version of "Terrible Things" can be found on Terrible Things debut album. In August, the band went on tour with the Scene Aesthetic and the Ready Set.

Track listing
 "If I Surrender (Acoustic)" - 4:05
 "Complaintor (Acoustic)" - 4:19
 "Terrible Things" - 3:38
 "The Intervention" - 3:57
 "Dark Clouds" - 4:47
 "It Isn't Me (Acoustic)" - 4:09
 "Hate To See You Go (Demo)" - 3:59

Personnel
Fred Mascherino - vocals, guitars
Stephen Curtiss - drums on "Hate to See You Go"

References

2009 EPs
The Color Fred albums
Equal Vision Records EPs
Record Store Day releases